The 1927–28 Ottawa Senators season was the club's 11th season in the NHL, 43rd overall. Ottawa qualified for the playoffs to try to win their second-straight Stanley Cup; however, they were eliminated by the Montreal Maroons in a two-game total-goals series, losing by a combined score of 3–1.

Regular season
The Senators were playing in by far the smallest market in the league, and were having problems financially due to escalating expenses. Part of the problem for the Senators was they had problems drawing fans against the expansion US teams, and as a result, they would play two "home" games in Detroit, collecting the bulk of the gate receipts.

The Senators would be led offensively by Frank Finnigan, who scored 20 goals and 25 points, both team highs, while 20-year-old Hec Kilrea would have a 23 point season.  King Clancy would be the anchor of the Ottawa defense, and put up 15 points, along with 73 PIM.  Cy Denneny would struggle all year long though, collecting only three goals, while the return of Punch Broadbent proved to be disastrous, as he only collected five points.

In goal, Alec Connell would have another strong season, earning 20 wins, having an NHL best 15 shutouts, and a 1.24 GAA.  Connell would set an NHL record for longest shutout streak, as he did not allow a goal in 464 minutes and 29 seconds, recording six shutouts during the streak.

Final standings

Record vs. opponents

Schedule and results

Playoffs

Playoffs
The Senators played the  Montreal Maroons in a first round two-game, total-goals series. The Maroons won the series by three goals to one.

Player statistics

Regular season
Scoring

Goaltending

Playoffs
Scoring

Goaltending

Transactions
The Senators were involved in the following transactions during the 1927–28 season.

Trades

Free agents signed

See also
 1927–28 NHL season

References

SHRP Sports
The Internet Hockey Database
National Hockey League Guide & Record Book 2007

Ottawa Senators (original) seasons
Ottawa
Ottawa